Kupon-e Olya (also Romanized as Kūpon-e ‘Olyā; also known as Kūpān, Kūpān-e ‘Olyā, and Kūpon-e Bālā) is a village in Rostam-e Seh Rural District, Sorna District, Rostam County, Fars Province, Iran. At the 2006 census, its population was 2,357, in 446 families.

References 

Populated places in Rostam County